Han Kil-son is a North Korean politician, who is the chief secretary of the Hyongjesan District Party Committee. On 4 January 2007, in Pyongyang, he gave a speech at a mass rally, with other high government officials praising Songun Korea.

References 

Year of birth missing (living people)
Living people
North Korean politicians